The United Nations Civil Assistance Corps Korea (UNCACK) was a United Nations military agency involved in the reconstruction and rehabilitation of the Republic of Korea (ROK) during the Korean War, from 1950 until 1953. Along with the United Nations Korean Reconstruction Agency (UNKRA), UNCACK was one of the major organizations providing humanitarian assistance to the ROK during the war.

The primary mission of UNCACK was "the prevention of disease, starvation and unrest among the civilian population", a mission implemented by providing a structure through which United Nations member nations could supply food, supplies, and technical assistance to Korea in cases when it was impossible to provide financial aid.

Following the cessation of hostilities in 1953, the duties of UNCACK were assumed by the Korean Civil Assistance Command (KCAC) of the United States military.

References

http://japanfocus.org/-Steven-Lee/3457

Organizations established by the United Nations
United Nations contingents in Korea